Kheibar Shekan or Kheibarshekan is an Iranian solid-fuel medium-range ballistic missile operated by the Islamic Revolutionary Guard Corps Aerospace Force. It is of the third generation of IRGC missiles and was unveiled in a ceremony attended by senior Iranian military commanders on the occasion of the 43rd anniversary of the Iranian Revolution. The missile has solid fuel and in the landing phase has maneuverability to pass through the missile shield and has the ability to hit targets with a range and a radius of 1,450 kilometers (900 miles).

Etymology 
Kheibar Shekan means "Fortress Breaker", "Kheibar" is the Jewish fortress that was conquered by the Muslims in the beginning of Islam, "Shekan" is equal to "Breaker" or "Destroyer".

Specifications 

The Kheibar Shekan missile uses solid fuel and weighs less than similar missiles. It has a definite operating radius of more than 1400 kilometers (900 miles), while the maneuverability of this missile is very high compared to its classmates. It is also referred to as a long-range ballistic and aim point missile.

The Kheibar Shekan missile can be considered as a new generation of missiles and a mutation in developments in the missile field of the Islamic Republic of Iran.

The Kheibar Shekan is one of the third generation of long-range missiles of the Islamic Revolutionary Guard Corps, which uses "solid fuel" and in the landing phase, has maneuverability to pass through the missile shield. Another important feature of the Kheibar Shekan missile is its optimal design, which weighs up to one-third less than similar models, and its preparation and firing time is reduced to one-sixth. Due to the design of the warhead and with special wingtips, the possibility of maneuvering this missile in the final phase to counter the anti-missile defense systems has been strengthened. This missile has high accuracy and has the ability to hit points. Its warhead can withstand very high temperatures.

Dimensions 
The Kheibar Shekan missile is 10.5 meters long, 80 centimeters in diameter, and weighs 4.5 tons with a 500-kilogram warhead. Its warhead is a fast and intense explosive type. The body of the Kheibar Shekan missile's body is made of Composite material same as Raad-500 missile.

One of the advantages of the Kheibar Shekan missile is its smaller dimensions compared to similar models. Therefore, in the limited space of underground missile bases, more of them can be stored.

Warheads 
The relatively larger dimensions of its warheads increase the maneuverability of the warhead after entering the atmosphere and allow for more sophisticated and faster maneuvers to effectively cross the barrier of in-air missile defenses, which are characteristic of defense systems such as David's Sling of Israel Defense Forces and the Patriot of the United States.

Its maneuverable reentry vehicle (MaRV) warheads maneuver when enter the Earth's atmosphere with the help of wingtips, which reduce kinetic energy and, of course, velocity during the maneuver. For this reason, at the moment the warhead hits the target, there are no signs of burning of the blocks and melting of the warhead, which makes it possible to perform heavy maneuvers to neutralize the enemy's air defense. The velocity of the warhead at the moment of impact is estimated at 2 to 3 Mach.

The Kheibar Shekan missile warhead configuration is of the Tri Conic type, which is used to maintain the warhead stability during heavy maneuvers. Of course, the amount of drag force in this configuration is a bit higher, but its due to achieve maneuverability. Therefore, the designers of this missile, by making engineering compromises, have preferred maneuverability to increasing the drag force.

Velocity 
The published images show the high speed of the Kheibar Shekan missile before leaving the Earth's atmosphere, so that the missile reaches speeds above 4-5 Mach before leaving the atmosphere. Such high acceleration greatly reduces the effects of deceleration due to the gravitational force of the earth, which ultimately leads to an increase in the range of the missile.

Launch vehicle 
The Kheibar Shekan missile has the ability to use a wide range of launchers. The launcher used for the Kheibar Shekan missile is mounted on a 10-wheel commercial chassis that can also be camouflaged as a commercial vehicle.

See also 
 Zolfaghar (missile)
 Sejjil (missile)
 Persian Gulf (missile)
 Soumar (missile)
 Battle of Khaybar

References

External links 
 The Kheibar Shekan missile video
 Iran unveils new 'strategic missile' with 1,450 km range
 Iran's unveils new 'Khyber Shikan' missile

Ballistic missiles of Iran
Medium-range ballistic missiles of Iran
Surface-to-surface missiles of Iran